XXXIII Corps is a corps of the Indian Army. It draws some of its heritage from the  British Indian XXXIII Corps which was formed in 1942, but disbanded in 1945. It was re-raised in 1960 at Shillong.

The corps is headquartered in Sukna in North Bengal and is commanded by a Three Star officer of the rank of Lieutenant General titled General Officer Commanding (GOC). His chief of staff is a Two Star officer of the rank of Major General. The total troop strength of the XXXIII corps is estimated to be between 45,000 and 60,000 soldiers.

History
The XXXIII Corps Operating Signal Regiment was a part of XIV Army during World War II. The regiment moved to its present location along with the Corps HQ in 1962. It participated in the Indo-China war of 1962 and captured some Chinese communication equipment. These equipment are kept in Corps of Signals Museum at Jabalpur to enable the future generations of soldiers know about the bravery and dedication shown by their predecessors.

Re-Raising
The corps was re-raised by Lieutenant General Umrao Singh on 1 November 1960, in order to reduce IV Corps's area of responsibilities. The Corps is headquartered in Sukna in North Bengal, near the city of Siliguri. Its area of responsibility includes North Bengal, Sikkim and if needed, Bhutan. It comprises three mountain divisions, 17th (Gangtok), 20th (Binnaguri), and 27th (Kalimpong). 
 
The coat of arms consists of a white horizontal band between two red bands (the standard formation sign background for corps in the Indian Army) with two crossed spears with wings in the foreground. The Corps HQ has an Indian Air Force air control unit attached to it, 3 TAC, commanded by a group captain. The corps also has an organic Army Aviation Helicopter Squadron based at Sevoke flying the HAL Chetak. It is commanded by a full colonel. The Indian Air Force bases at Bagdogra (Siliguri) and Hashimara are the air units co-tasked to the XXXIII Corps Area of Responsibility.

ORBAT
It currently consists of:

17th Mountain Division (Blackcat Division) headquartered at Gangtok. 
It was raised in 1959 and converted to a mountain division in 1963. 
It is assigned to the Sikkim sector.
20th Mountain Division (Kirpan Division) headquartered at Binnaguri.
It was raised in 1963 and assigned to the Sikkim sector. 
Composed of 66, 165, and 202 Mountain Brigades in 1971.
27th Mountain Division (Striking Lion Division) headquartered at Kalimpong. 
It was converted to a mountain division in 1963. 
Artillery brigade

Indo-Pakistani War of 1971
The corps handled the sensitive Indo-Tibetan border and was responsible for the defence of the McMahon Line. The corps under Lieutenant General Mohan L. Thapan controlled 6 and 20 Mountain Divisions and 71 Mountain Brigade. While fighting the war to the south, however, the corps also had to look north and retained command of 17 and 27 Mountain Divisions on the Tibetan frontier. Furthermore, Thapan could not commit 6 Mountain Division without permission from New Delhi as it was to be held ready to move to the Bhutanese border in case China intervened in the war.

As elsewhere along the border, Indian forces in support of the Mukti Bahini made significant
in roads into East Pakistan prior to 3 December. Most notable was Brigadier Pran Nath Kathpalia’s 71 Mountain Brigade, which had pushed to the outskirts of Thakurgaon by the eve of war. Efforts to capture the heavily fortified border village of Hilli, however, failed repeatedly in a struggle that raged off and on from 24 November to 11 December. Resolutely defended by Pakistani 4 Frontier Force, Hilli blocked the proposed advance of 20 Division across the narrow “waist” of this sector.

After heavy losses in front of Hilli, the 20 division solved this problem by swinging around to the north and unleashing 340 Brigade under Brigadier Joginder Singh Bakshi. Bakshi moved swiftly to control the main north-south road, unhinging the defense of Hilli, splitting Pakistani 16 Division, and opening the way to Bogra, which town he effectively controlled by war’s end. The Pakistani division, despite continued resistance by isolated units, had ceased to exist as a coherent combat formation. Indicative of the chaotic situation, General Shah and the commander of 205 Brigade, Brigadier Tajammul Hussain Malik, were almost captured when Indian forces ambushed their convoy on 7 December. On the other hand, a last-minute Indian moves north by 66 and 202 Brigades to capture Rangpur proved unsuccessful.

In secondary actions, 9 Mountain Brigade secured most of the area north of the Tista River and an ad hoc command of Indian BSF and Mukti Bahini under Brigadier Prem Singh pushed out of Malda to capture Nawabganj in the extreme southeastern corner of the sector. Despite Bakshi’s performance and the generally successful advance of 71 Brigade, much of XXXIII Corps’ offensive power was allowed to lie idle far too long and Pakistani troops still held the major towns of the sector (Rangpur, Saidpur, Dinajpur, Nator, Rajshahi) when the cease-fire was announced. Likewise, the cease-fire intervened before the Indians could implement a hastily conceived plan to transfer 340 Brigade, a tank squadron, and an artillery battery across the Jamuna via the Phulchari ferry to take part in the advance on Dacca. With the exception of this squadron, all the armour was preparing to transfer to the west by the end of the war.

General Officers Commanding

References

Sources
Jane's World Armies, Issue 19, 2006
Globalsecurity.org

033
Military units and formations established in 1962